The Wurzen Pass is a mountain pass in a col of the Karawanks mountain range in the Southern Limestone Alps, on the border between Radendorf in the Austrian state of Carinthia and Kranjska Gora in Slovenia. It is named after the nearby village of Podkoren (Wurzen).

The pass connects the Austrian B109 Wurzenpass Straße from Villach with the Slovenian highway No. 201 to the A2 motorway and Ljubljana.

History
The Wurzenpass has been a historic crossing of the Karawanks, though the main trade route from the Duchy of Carinthia to Trieste, the Austrian Littoral and Carniola ran from Tarvisio along the Predil Pass and the high valley of Rateče that was much easier to traverse. Its importance increased with the lay out of a first paved road finished in 1734. During the Cold War the Austrian Armed Forces built several defence works and bunkers along the Wurzenpass Straße which today are open to the public in the context of a documentation centre.

Until the opening of the Karawanks Motorway Tunnel in 1991, the Wurzenpass along with the eastern Loibl (Ljubelj) was one of the main arteries for traffic from Austria through former Yugoslavia, starting point of the notorious autoput highway to Greece and Turkey. When Slovenia joined the European Union on 1 May 2004, customs controls were removed from the border. As Slovenia entered the Schengen Area in 2007, passport controls with police checkpoints were consequently abolished on 21 December 2007.

See also
 List of highest paved roads in Europe
 List of mountain passes

References

External links

Bunker museum
Wurzen Pass. Information about Wurzen Pass (German)

Mountain passes of Slovenia
Mountain passes of the Alps
Mountain passes of Carinthia (state)
Austria–Slovenia border crossings